The Union, Gaffney City and Rutherfordton Railroad was a railroad chartered by the South Carolina General Assembly shortly after the end of Reconstruction.

The Union, Gaffney City and Rutherfordton Railroad was chartered by the South Carolina General Assembly in 1878. The line changed its name to the Atlantic and Northwestern Railroad in 1885.

In 1887, the Atlantic and Northwestern Railroad merged with the Augusta, Edgefield and Newberry Railroad to create the Georgia and Carolina Midland Railroad.

References

Defunct South Carolina railroads
Predecessors of the Southern Railway (U.S.)
Railway companies established in 1878
Railway companies disestablished in 1885
1878 establishments in South Carolina
1885 disestablishments in South Carolina